Sergei Danilovich Skazkin (Russian: Сергей Данилович Сказкин; October 19, 1890, Novocherkassk - April 14, 1973, Moscow) was a Soviet historian, Academician of the USSR Academy of Sciences (since 1958). Doctor of Sciences in Historical Sciences (1935).

Skazkin graduated from Moscow State University (MSU) in 1915 and began teaching at the university in 1920. In 1935, he became Professor of the Faculty of History, and from 1949 he was Head of the Department of Medieval History.
He succeeded E. A. Kosminsky.

In addition to research at MSU, Skazkin also performed research at the Institute of History of the USSR. In 1961, he headed its section of Medieval History, Institute of History, and Academy of Sciences of the USSR. After the institute's division in 1968, Skazkin headed the same sections at the Institute of History, Academy of Sciences of the USSR.

References

1890 births
1973 deaths
Soviet historians
Moscow State University alumni
Full Members of the USSR Academy of Sciences
Professors of the Moscow State University
Soviet Byzantinists